Harley Stroh is a game designer who has worked primarily on role-playing games.

Career
Harley Stroh is a long-time author for Goodman Games and later became the Dungeon Crawl Classics Line editor. Stroh authored Sellswords of Punjar, the first GSL-less product from Goodman Games after the release of Dungeons & Dragons fourth edition. Stroh designed Dragora's Dungeon (2008) and Curse of the Kingspire (2009), the only two releases in the Master Dungeons line for fourth edition D&D. Stroh's Death Dealer: Shadows of Mirahan (2010) offered a campaign setting based on a Frank Frazetta character.

References

External links
 Home page
 

Living people
Role-playing game designers
Year of birth missing (living people)